Lohthambh or Lohtamias are a clan of  Rajputs.   They are consider  Suryavanshi Rajput of Badgujar branch and descendants of Lav ( Son of Ram )They have their Fort ranging from Lahore (today in Pakistan) to Lohgarh in Maharashtra.Kuldevi of this vansh is Chandi Mata

History
They migrated to Rajnagar and occupied multiple villages in the area with all Lohtamias claiming descent from a common ancestor. During the 17th century, they occupied a fort known as Rajnagar garh, the remains of which are still visible today. Elders from the community state that they engaged in territorial disputes with other Rajput lineages including the Rajas of Dumraon.

Rajnagar developed into a minor chiefdom that was heavily militarised and the Lohtamia zamindars dominated life in the region however by the British-era, many Lohtamias lost their dominance due to continuous disputes with other Rajput clans and neighbouring castes.

The Lohtamia tradition traces the community's ancestry to four brothers who migrated from Rajasthan around five hundred years ago however Kumar Suresh Singh was of the opinion that Lohtamias were indigenous to Bihar.

See also
Babu Saheb
Purbiya

References

Rajput clans of Bihar